San Lorenzo is a district of the Tarrazú canton, in the San José province of Costa Rica.

History 
San Lorenzo was created on 26 September 1923 by Acuerdo 419.

Geography 
San Lorenzo has an area of  km² and an elevation of  metres.

Demographics 

For the 2011 census, San Lorenzo had a population of  inhabitants.

Transportation

Road transportation 
The district is covered by the following road routes:
 National Route 303

References 

Districts of San José Province
Populated places in San José Province